The Oya Tabu white-eye (Zosterops crookshanki) is a species of bird in the family Zosteropidae. It is native to the Fergusson and Goodenough islands (D'Entrecasteaux Islands). Its natural habitat is in subtropical or tropical moist montane forests. The Oya Tabu white-eye was formerly considered a subspecies of the capped white-eye (Zosterops fuscicapilla).

References

Oya Tabu white-eye
Birds of the D'Entrecasteaux Islands
Oya Tabu white-eye
Oya Tabu white-eye
Oya Tabu white-eye